Hornsby Bend is a census-designated place (CDP) in Travis County, Texas, United States. This was a new CDP for the 2010 census with a population of 6,791, increasing to 12,168 in 2020. The area was named after early settler and Republic of Texas era postmaster Reuben Hornsby. His great-grandson, Baseball Hall of Famer Rogers Hornsby, is buried in Hornsby Bend.

Geography
Hornsby Bend is located at  (30.244961, -97.583272).

Demographics 

As of the 2020 United States census, there were 12,168 people, 2,740 households, and 2,174 families residing in the CDP.

References

Census-designated places in Travis County, Texas